Spontaneanation with Paul F. Tompkins (stylized as SPONTANEANATION with Paul F. Tompkins) was an improv comedy podcast hosted by Paul F. Tompkins on the Earwolf network. Based upon an interview with a special guest, Tompkins and several "improvisational friends" (often co-stars from The Thrilling Adventure Hour, Superego, No, You Shut Up!, or Bajillion Dollar Propertie$) performed narrative improv, set in a location provided by the guest.  Spontaneanation'''s 200th and final episode was released on January 21, 2019.

Episode format
Each episode of Spontaneanation contains two segments: an interview with a special guest, followed by an improvisational scene that contains elements from the preceding interview, taking place in a setting given by that week's guest. Each interview begins with a question supplied by the previous episode's guest, without revealing their identity. Additionally, Tompkins begins each show with a brief improvised stream of consciousness monologue. The improvisational scene and monologue are scored by Eban Schletter on piano.

The podcast is notably different from Tompkins' previous podcast, The Pod F. Tompkast, in that it is entirely improvised, where the Tompkast featured pre-recorded bits and heavy editing.

Because I’m used to everything I do being very involved with a lot of pre-production and post-production and I really wanted to be able to walk in, record and it's just done. And that's how I arrived at what is Spontaneanation.

— Paul F. Tompkins

Tompkins ends each episode with the phrase semper en presente, a Latin phrase translating to "always in the present" or "always in the moment."

In addition to in-studio tapings, Spontaneanation is often recorded in front of a live audience at Café Largo in Los Angeles.

At the end of the May 28th, 2018 "Tribute To Paul F. Tompkins" episode, Tompkins announced that he would be formally ending Spontaneanation once it reached 200 episodes. The 200th episode, "Charleston, South Carolina", dropped January 20, 2019; Busy Philipps was the featured guest—she was also guest on episode one.

Episode list† signifies that the guest participated in the improv bit of the show.

(*) denotes that the episode was recorded in front of a live audience.

Improv players

Recognition
The podcast has been listed on several "Best Of" lists for podcasts in 2015. The show was included in Apple's collection of "The Best Podcasts of 2015. Paste magazine placed Spontaneanation in the fifth spot on their list of The 10 Best Comedy Podcasts of 2015, referring to it as "both an illuminating chat show and a strong argument in favor of the often-maligned artform of improv comedy." "A Theme Park Break Room" was included on Vulture's list of the Best Comedy Podcast Episodes of 2015, referring to it as "what was easily one of the most wildly funny podcasts of 2015."

References

External links

Audio podcasts
Comedy and humor podcasts
Earwolf
2015 podcast debuts
2019 podcast endings
Improvisational podcasts